Guerreros de Hermosillo Fútbol Club were a Mexican football team who played in Hermosillo in the state of Sonora. They purchased the rights of Real Colima to play in the Liga de Ascenso.

History
The club lasted one and a half seasons in the Liga de Ascenso before being disestablished due to financial issues between the Apertura and the Clausura of the 2010–2011 seasons. No team took their place, and the 2011 Clausura season was played with 17 teams.

Managers
 Gastón Obledo (2009)
 Marcelino Bernal (2010)

Year-by-year

External links
 Liga MX profile
 https://web.archive.org/web/20090804113504/http://www.guerrerosdehermosillo.com/

Association football clubs established in 2009
Association football clubs disestablished in 2010
Ascenso MX teams
Defunct football clubs in Mexico
Football clubs in Sonora
Sport in Hermosillo
2009 establishments in Mexico
2010 disestablishments in Mexico